Aigrette was the lead boat of the s built for the French Navy between 1902 and 1905. Laid down in May 1902, she was launched in February 1904 and commissioned in 1908. She was essentially an experimental submarine, and although in service during World War I, saw no action. The class was designed by Maxime Laubeuf and used Drzewiecki drop collar launchers and external cradles to launch torpedoes.

Design

Her complement was 14 men.

The submarines armament comprised two  Drzewiecki drop collar torpedo launchers and two  torpedoes in external cradles.

Construction and career
Aigrette was ordered and laid down on 13 May 1902, launched in February 1904 and commissioned in 1908. She was the first submersible in the world to be launched which used a diesel engine for surface running  although the experimental submarine  was both the first to be ordered and commissioned.

On 5 October 1904, hydrogen leaked out of the submarine's battery causing parts of it to explode, and on 13 May 1908, she was sent to Toulon to serve as a training boat.

During World War I, Aigrette served in defensive positions in Brest and in Cherbourg. In 1916, Aigrette participated in successful tests for underwater cutting of anti-submarine nets, but the result were never implemented in a warship before the end of the war.

Aigrette was retired from service on 12 November 1919 and sold for scrap at Toulon on 14 April 1920.

See also 

List of submarines of France

References

Citations 

World War I submarines of France
Aigrette-class submarines
1904 ships